Mohamed Ali Mahjoubi (born 28 December 1966) is a Tunisian former professional footballer who played as a midfielder. He represented Tunisia at the 1994 African Cup of Nations, as well as the 1988 Olympic Games.

Honours
Espérance Sportive de Tunis
 Tunisian Ligue Professionnelle 1: 1993–94
 CAF Champions League: 1994
 CAF Super Cup: 1995

AS Marsa
Tunisian President Cup: 1983–84, 1989–90

References

External links
 
 
 

1966 births
Living people
Tunisian footballers
Association football defenders
Tunisia international footballers
Olympic footballers of Tunisia
Footballers at the 1988 Summer Olympics
1994 African Cup of Nations players
Tunisian Ligue Professionnelle 1 players
2. Bundesliga players
AS Marsa players
Eintracht Braunschweig players
Espérance Sportive de Tunis players
Expatriate footballers in Germany
Tunisian expatriate sportspeople in Germany
Tunisian expatriate footballers